Bastam Darreh (also Romanized as Basţām Darreh) is a village in Maraveh Tappeh Rural District, in the Central District of Maraveh Tappeh County, Golestan Province, Iran. At the 2006 census, its population was 284, in 65 families.

References 

Populated places in Maraveh Tappeh County